Conus hieroglyphus, common name the hieroglyphic cone, is a species of sea snail, a marine gastropod mollusk in the family Conidae, the cone snails and their allies.

Like all species within the genus Conus, these snails are predatory and venomous. They are capable of "stinging" humans, therefore live ones should be handled carefully or not at all.

Distribution
This marine species occurs off Aruba, the Netherlands Antilles.

Description 
The maximum recorded shell length is 23 mm.
The white shell shows revolving series of spots and irregular or cloud-like markings of orange, chestnut or chocolate, often forming interrupted bands. The base is grooved. The spire has a single broad sulcus.

Habitat 
Minimum recorded depth is 6 m. Maximum recorded depth is 6 m.

References

  Adams, C. B. 1850. Description of supposed new species of marine shells which inhabit Jamaica. Contributions to Conchology, 4: 56–68, 109–123
 Puillandre N., Duda T.F., Meyer C., Olivera B.M. & Bouchet P. (2015). One, four or 100 genera? A new classification of the cone snails. Journal of Molluscan Studies. 81: 1–23

External links
 The Conus Biodiversity website
Cone Shells - Knights of the Sea
 

hieroglyphus
Gastropods described in 1833